"I Love You" is a song by American singer and songwriter Donna Summer from her sixth studio album Once Upon a Time (1977). It peaked at number 10 on the UK Singles Chart and reached number 37 on the US Billboard Hot 100 in 1977. The song also peaked at 29, 10, and 24 in Canada, Norway, and Spain respectively.

Background
Originally featured on her album Once Upon a Time, it was edited in length for release as a single. The album is a double LP concept album telling a modern-day Cinderella rags-to-riches story. "I Love You" is featured toward the end of the album when the main character comes face to face with the object of her desire and they declare their love for each other.

Record World called it a "swirling, melodic disco tune."

Chart history

In popular culture
The song was also featured prominently in the Saturday Night Live skits "Sabra Shopping Network" and "Sabra Price is Right", featuring Tom Hanks. In 2018, the song was included in the Broadway musical Summer: The Donna Summer Musical. It was also included on the soundtrack for the musical.

References

Donna Summer songs
1977 singles
1977 songs
Songs written by Pete Bellotte
Songs written by Giorgio Moroder
Songs written by Donna Summer
Casablanca Records singles
Song recordings produced by Giorgio Moroder
Song recordings produced by Pete Bellotte